Wanka, Wanqa, Huanca or their plurals may refer to:

In Peru
 Huanca people or Wancas or Wankas, a Quechua people living in the Junín Region 
 Wanka Quechua, a variety of the Quechua language
 Huanca District in Caylloma Province
 Huancas District in Chachapoyas Province
 Deportivo Wanka, a football club
 Huanca (mountain), in the Andes of Peru
Huanca (monolith), sacred stone monuments

People
 Johanna Wanka (born 1951), a German politician 
 Rolf Wanka (1901–1982), an Austrian actor
 Lamar Nelson (born 1991), known as Wanka, a Jamaican international football player

Other uses
 Wańka, or Filipinka, unofficial names for a Polish hand grenade
 USS Wanka (1901), a U.S. Navy motorboat

See also 

 Wank (disambiguation)
 Wanker (disambiguation)
 Wonka (disambiguation)
 Wanké
 Wänke
 Wainka

Language and nationality disambiguation pages